Derek Watson may refer to:

 Derek Watson (priest) (born 1938), Dean of Salisbury, 1996–2002
 Derek Watson (gridiron football) (born 1981), Canadian football running back
 Derek Watson (actor and musicologist) (born 1948)